Jiao Ting is a fictional character in Water Margin, one of the Four Great Classical Novels of Chinese literature. Nicknamed "Faceless", he ranks 98th among the 108 Stars of Destiny and 62nd among the 72 Earthly Fiends.

Background
Jiao Ting, a native of Zhongshan Prefecture (中山府; around present-day Dingzhou, Hebei), is skilled in wrestling, having mastered a set of techniques developed by his grandfather and taught only within the family. As he has no distinguished background and connection, he could not find anyone willing to shelter him when he becomes a drifter. For that reason he is nicknamed "Faceless".

Joining Liangshan
Jiao Ting intends to join the bandits on Mount Deadwood in Kouzhou (寇州; believed to be present-day Guan County, Shandong) led by Bao Xu. On his way there, he runs into Li Kui, who, annoyed by his stare, wants to beat him up. But Jiao Ting easily tackles him to the ground twice.

Impressed with Jiao Ting's wrestling skill, Li Kui asks him to join Liangshan Marsh. In fact Li has sneaked out of the stronghold after Song Jiang disallowed him to join Guan Sheng in a military attack on Shan Tinggui and Wei Dingguo in Lingzhou (in present-day Dezhou, Shandong). Shan and Wei are imperial generals about to set out on an expedition against Liangshan ordered by the Song court.

Jiao Ting thinks Li Kui could work out something with Bao Xu. So the two go to Mount Deadwood. When they are at Bao's stronghold, the convoy escorting Xuan Zan and Hao Siwen, who have been captured by Shan and Wei at Lingzhou, to the imperial capital Dongjing happens to come past. Together, the three rescue the two lieutenants of Guan Sheng.

Li Kui, assisted by Jiao Ting, Bao Xu, Xuan Zan and Hao Siwen, attacks a gate of Lingzhou, causing the city to fall, when Wei Dingguo is outside of it fighting Guan Sheng. Earlier Guan has already beaten Shan Tinggui in a one-on-one fight and won him over. Later Wei also surrenders and Guan returns to Liangshan with the group, which includes Jiao Ting.

Campaigns and death
Jiao Ting is appointed as one of the leaders of the Liangshan infantry after the 108 Stars of Destiny came together in what is called the Grand Assembly. He participates in the campaigns against the Liao invaders and rebel forces in Song territory following amnesty from Emperor Huizong for Liangshan.

Jiao Ting is killed in the battle of Runzhou (潤州; present-day Runzhou District, Zhenjiang, Jiangsu) in the campaign against Fang La.

References
 
 
 
 
 
 
 

72 Earthly Fiends
Fictional wrestlers
Fictional characters from Hebei